Daasebre Gyamenah (Akan: Daasebrε Gyamena), was a Ghanaian highlife musician who became very popular for his hit album Kokooko (1999) which featured Lord Kenya. Kokooko was the first major fusion of hiplife and highlife in Ghana. Many successful albums followed thus earning him one of his many nicknames "Hitman"."Wo da enda","Ahoofe", and "Still I love you" are a few of his popular songs.

Among youths and old, he is popular and beloved. Daasebre's songs are mostly mid tempo and include many hip hop elements. He featured many hip life artists like none of his genre colleagues. A major element of his songs is the Akan way of storytelling by use of proverbs. His proverbs stood out from others due to his upbringing through his grandmother. These proverbs mostly summed up the message of his songs. In an interview he claimed to have experienced some of the stories in his songs with the exception of the love songs.

In 2006, Daasebre took a flight from Ghana to London to work on his music. At Heathrow airport he was arrested by police. His luggage contained cocaine of which he claimed to have no clue of. Eleven months in prison had a big impact on him. He was never convicted of the crime due to facts suggesting he did not know of the existence of the drugs. His following lead single for his next album "Saa Na Etee" was mainly about his arrest. He talked about it in songs like "Twaso" and "Gye Me".

His death in 2016 came at a time many Ghanaians musicians had died but his death was the most felt among all. As one part of his family were Muslim he should have received a Muslim burial but his other family refused. Their main reason was the fact he was of royal blood and should be buried as such. A long feud led to him been buried in December of that year, almost six months after his death. Many tributes to him followed after his death. "Kokooko" by Sarkodie and "Daasebre Gyamenah" by Daddy Lumba are two which have gained popularity.

Life and career
Daasebre was born a Muslim and from a royal home. His full name at birth was Daasebre Gyamenah Abubakar Siddiq. His late mother was a Muslim who died when Daasebre was only three months old. He was nicknamed Ahoofe, a name his fans gave him after the release of his hit song, "Ahoofe", which literally means beautiful or the handsome one. He released an Album in the late 80s with no success. After spending time in various African states he returned to Ghana in 1992 only to make music 7 years later. His first hit, Kokooko, made him and Lord Kenya, who was featured on a song, gain huge success in Ghana and also among Ghanaians abroad.In January 2016, Gyamenah released what turned out to be his final album, Yenfii Ta, and in May released a song from the album and his final single, "Ntamago".

Death 
He died in the early hours of 29 July 2016 at the 37 Military Hospital in Accra.

Honours and awards
He won two and four awards during the 2000 and 2002 editions of the Ghana Music Awards respectively.

Discography 

 Kokooko
 Ahoofe
 You Can't Touch Me
 Calling
 How Far?
 I Beg
 A Friend In Need
 Yeegye Apem
 Odo Yede
 Yenfii Ta

References

Musicians from Accra
People from Koforidua
1968 births
2016 deaths